Business process outsourcing to India refers to the business process outsourcing services in the outsourcing industry in India, catering mainly to Western operations of multinational corporations (MNCs).

As of 2012, around 2.8 million people work in outsourcing sector. Annual revenues are around $11 billion, around 1% of GDP. Around 2.5 million people graduate in India every year. Wages are rising by 10–15 percent as a result of skill shortage.

History

Amex
In the second half of the 1980s, American Express consolidated its JAPAC (Japan and Asia Pacific) back office operations into Gurgaon region. This centre (called the Financial Resource Centre East or FRC-E)was headed by an Expat Harry Robertson, a veteran American Express employee with Raman Roy reporting to him, Raman Roy later on quit Amex to join GE and later on started his own enterprise called Spectramind which got later on merged with Wipro and then later on started Quatrro BPO.

General Electric
In the 1990s Jack Welch was influenced by K.P. Singh, (a Delhi-based realtor) to look at Gurgaon in the NCR region as a base for back office operations. Pramod Bhasin, the India head of G.E. hired Raman Roy and several of his management from American Express to start this enterprise called GECIS (GE Capital International Services). Raman for the first time tried out voice operations out of India. The operations in India were the Beta site for the GE Six sigma enterprise, as well. The results made GE ramp up their Indian presence and look at other locations. 

In 2004 GECIS was spun off as a separate legal entity by GE, called Genpact. GE has retained a 40% stake and sold a 60% stake for $500 million to two equity companies, Oak Hill Capital Partners and General Atlantic Partners.

Third party BPOs
Until G.E. most of the work was being done by "captives"- a term used for in house work being done for the parent organisation. In 2000 Raman Roy and some team members from GECIS quit, and with VC funding from Chrysalis Capital, started Spectramind. At the same time, an organisation called Efunds started in Mumbai and Gurgaon,  in New Delhi and Daksh in Gurgaon. One of the current big BPO firms, EXL Services, started in April 1999, and in 2012 hit $442.9 million in revenues.

However, recently, most of the Indian BPOs, even smaller and mid-sized ones, are setting up their onshore presence in the markets they serve. Most of the large players are improving the outsourced business processes by leveraging on their years of experience, and now some are offering more than just plain vanilla BPO processes. KPO, transformation and Consulting opportunities are gaining favour among large third party BPO providers like Genpact, Infosys BPM, WNS and EXL Services.

Future of outsourcing services to India
Analysts believe that India remains a vital destination for outsourcing and expect its annual GDP to grow at 8–10% for the next decade. In addition, outsourcing efforts to India are held up as an effective remedy for concerns about both Chinese government policy and labour force issues, such as increasing costs and shortages.

Size of the industry 

The industry has been growing rapidly. It grew at a rate of 38% over 2005.  For the FY06 financial year the projections is of US$7.2 billion worth of services provided by this industry. The base in terms of headcount being roughly 400,000 people directly employed in this Industry.  The global BPO Industry is estimated to be worth 120–150 billion dollars, of this the offshore BPO is estimated to be some US$11.4 billion. India thus has some 5–6% share of the total Industry, but a commanding 63% share of the offshore component.  The U.S $7.2 billion also represents some 20% of the IT and BPO Industry which is in total expected to have revenues worth US$36 billion for 2006. The headcount at 400,000 is some 40% of the approximate one million workers estimated to be directly employed in the IT and BPO Sector.

The related Industry dependent on this are Catering, BPO training and recruitment, transport vendors (home pick up and drops for night shifts being the norm in the industry), security agencies, facilities management companies.

Registration of BPO as OSP 
BPO/KPO/Domestic & International Call Centres/NOC etc. are covered under the 'Other Service Provider' (OSP) Category by the Department of Telecommunications.

The companies who are providing the 'Applications Services' means providing services like tele-banking, tele-medicine, tele-education, tele-trading, e-commerce, call centre, network operation centre and other IT Enabled Services, by using Telecom Resources provided by
Authorised Telecom Service Providers. The 'Telecom Resource' means Telecom facilities used by the OSP including, but not limited to Public Switched Telecom Network (PSTN), Public Land Mobile Network (PLMN), Integrated Services Digital Network (ISDN) and /or the telecom bandwidth provided by authorized telecom service provider having valid licence under Indian Telegraph Act, 1885.
The 'Company' means a company registered under Indian Companies Act including foreign companies permitted by RBI under Foreign Exchange Management Regulations and registered under Part-XI(Section 591 to 608) of the Companies Act, 1956 for setting up a place of business in India.
'Domestic OSP' are the OSP providing the Application Services within national
boundaries. 'International OSP' are the OSP providing the Application Services beyond
national boundaries.

General conditions of OSP registration 

(1) Registration may be granted to any company to provide Application Services. These service providers will not infringe on the jurisdiction of other Authorised Telecom Service Providers and they will not provide switched telephony.
(2) The entities entitled for OSP registration must be a company registered under
Indian Companies Act, 1956.
(3) A Company may apply for registration to the Authority in the proforma prescribed by the Authority from time to time.

Online system for OSP registration 

It is mandatory to get new Registration Number allotted by the Online OSP Registration system for the existing OSP Registrations. In case you have existing registered OSP sites for which you would like to get the new Registration Number from the system please contact Assistant Director General (ADG) of the concerned Telecom Enforcement, Resource and Monitoring Cell (TERM Cell) preferably before applying for the login-id from the system.

Bangalore, Chennai, Hyderabad, Gurgaon, NCR, Ahmedabad, Mumbai and Pune are Tier I cities that are leading IT cities in India.

With rising infrastructure costs in these cities, many BPO's are shifting operations to Tier II cities like Nashik, Sangli, Aurangabad (Maharashtra), Mangalore, Mysore, Hubli-Dharwad, Belgaum, Coimbatore, Nagpur, Trichy, Calicut, Kochi, Trivandrum, Chandigarh, Mohali, Panchkula, Bhubaneshwar, Jaipur, Visakhapatnam, Raipur and Lucknow. Jammu and Kashmir with companies like imProSols opening operations have become new hubs for outsourcing due to right resources availability at very affordable prices

Tier II cities offer lower business process overhead compared to Tier I cities, but have a less reliable infrastructure system which may hamper dedicated operations. The Government of India in partnership with private infrastructure corporations is working on bringing all around development and providing robust infrastructure all over the nation.

Criticisms

The BPO industry in India has attracted criticism from some observers.

 Shehzad Nadeem, of the Sociology Department at Lehman College, City University of New York, reports that Indian call-centre employees, to confirm to expectations of the US consumers who they support long-distance, are expected to imitate the Western employees they have replaced in terms of the use of US vernacular, even temporarily adopting an Anglo name during the call. While this is true, Nadeem claims further that this temporary switch to an American-like identity inflicts psychological distress, and has led to the adoption of Western-style-consumer lifestyles by the employees, who earn far more than their compatriots.
 Jyoti Saraswati of the Stern School of Business, New York University, claims that the outsourcing industry's political influence far exceeds the industry's economic contribution, and has allowed the industry to secure the support and resources of the Indian state ahead of other sectors of the national economy where the developmental returns would be far greater.

Another point that should be considered while outsourcing, not only to India but any other region, is Intellectual Property Protection. When companies outsource their work, they have to dilute their core knowledge related to process before transferring the diluted knowledge to the outsource. If they fail to do this, the outsource can learn enough about the outsourcing organization's business to compete with them later by offering similar services in their own country or even multi-nationally.

See also

General
 H-1B visa
 Globalisation
 Software Technology Parks of India
 Nalini by Day, Nancy by Night, 2005 documentary on outsourcing in India

Large BPO parks
 Tidel Park
 HITEC City
 Silicon Valley of India

Economy
 Economy of India
 Remittances to India 
 Foreign trade of India
 List of exports of India
 Largest trading partners of India   
 Indian diaspora
 Indianisation

References

Further reading
 
 
 
 
 
 
 
 
 
Nadeem, Shehzad. Dead Ringers:How Outsourcing is Changing the Way Indians Understand Themselves. .
Saraswati, Jyoti. Dot.compradors: Power and Policy in the Development of the Indian Software Industry. .

External links
 NASSCOM (National Association of Software & Service Companies)
 Ministry of Communications & Information Technology, Department of Information Technology, India
Articles
 The Rise Of India, Business Week Online
 Inside Outsourcing in India, CIO.com
 India's New Faces of Outsourcing, The Washington Post
 Outsourcing: Silicon Valley East, MSNBC
 Where the Good Jobs Are Going, Jyoti Thottam, Time.com
 Some U.S. hospitals outsourcing work: Shortage of radiologists spurs growing telemedicine trend, Associated Press

Videos
 The Other Side of Outsourcing, Discovery Times Channel
 Exporting IT: Austin to India, News 8 Austin
 Will India's outsourcing boom ever bust?: Infosys Chairman  talks outsourcing, News.com
 India 101 on eweek Video Seminars hosted by Stan Gibson
 The Rise of India, ABC News